Cooper House, also known as Wilds House, is a historic home located at Kenton, Kent County, Delaware.  The house was built about 1794, as a two-story, three bay, side hall plan stuccoed brick structure. A two-story rear wing was added in the latter half of the 19th century. Fugitive slaves on the Underground Railroad were harbored in a secret room over the kitchen.

It was listed on the National Register of Historic Places in 1973.

References

See also
National Register of Historic Places listings in Kent County, Delaware

Houses on the National Register of Historic Places in Delaware
Houses completed in 1794
Houses in Kent County, Delaware
Kenton, Delaware
National Register of Historic Places in Kent County, Delaware
1794 establishments in the United States